This is a summary of the electoral history of Theresa May, who served as Prime Minister of the United Kingdom and Leader of the Conservative Party from 2016 to 2019. She has been the Member of Parliament (MP) for Maidenhead since 1997.

Council elections

1986 Merton London Borough Council election, Durnsford

1990 Merton London Borough Council election, Durnsford

Parliamentary elections

1992 general election, North West Durham

1994 by-election, Barking

1997 general election, Maidenhead

2001 general election, Maidenhead

2005 general election, Maidenhead

2010 general election, Maidenhead

2015 general election, Maidenhead

2017 general election, Maidenhead

2019 general election, Maidenhead

2016 Conservative Party leadership election

2017 United Kingdom general election

References

Theresa May
May, Theresa
May, Theresa